Adrift on Life's Tide is a 1913 British silent drama film directed by Warwick Buckland and starring Alma Taylor, Flora Morris and Harry Royston.

Plot summary 
A drunkard's daughter is adopted, rejected, becomes a dancer, and spurns wealth for love.

Cast
 Alma Taylor as Edna Wilson 
 Flora Morris as Mrs. Wilson 
 Harry Royston as Mr. Wilson  
 Harry Gilbey as The Rich Man

References

Bibliography
 Palmer, Scott. British Film Actors' Credits, 1895-1987. McFarland, 1988.

External links

1913 films
Films set in England
1913 drama films
British drama films
British silent short films
1910s English-language films
Films directed by Warwick Buckland
British black-and-white films
1910s British films
Silent drama films